Inge Offermann (née Kilian, born 3 June 1935) is a retired German high jumper, who competed in the 1956 Summer Olympics.

Born in Geisenheim, Kilian moved to Braunschweig as a child, where she took up athletics at the age of 12. She competed for the sports club Eintracht Braunschweig. Kilian won national championships in 1955, 1956, 1957 and 1958, as well as West German indoor titles in 1956 and 1959. She set German records in 1956 (three times) and 1958.

Kilian represented the United Team of Germany at the 1956 Summer Olympics in Melbourne, where she placed 18th. She also placed 4th at the 1958 European Athletics Championships in Stockholm.

Competition record

References

1935 births
Living people
People from Rheingau-Taunus-Kreis
Sportspeople from Darmstadt (region)
Sportspeople from Braunschweig
Eintracht Braunschweig athletes
German female high jumpers
Athletes (track and field) at the 1956 Summer Olympics
Olympic athletes of Germany
German national athletics champions